Pennichnus formosae is an extinct species of ambush‐predatory worm.

References

Protostomes